Esquire Records was the record label which distributed Petula Clark's first singles in Australia.

See also

List of record labels

References

Australian record labels
Defunct record labels of Australia